Camp Creek is a stream in St. Francis county in southeast Missouri. It is a tributary of Wolf Creek.

Wolf Creek begins at the confluence of Camp Creek and Taylor Branch.

Camp Creek, historically known as "Camp Branch", most likely was so named on account of a campground near its course.

See also
List of rivers of Missouri

References

Rivers of St. Francois County, Missouri
Rivers of Missouri